Galatasaray S.K., is a professional basketball team based in the city of Istanbul in Turkey. It is a part of the Galatasaray Sports Club. The team competes in the Turkish Basketball Super League and Basketball Champions League. The team has won 16 Turkish championships (5 titles in the Turkish Super League and 11 in the former Turkish Basketball Championship). The team furthermore won 3 Turkish Cups, 2 Turkish Super Cups, and 1 EuroCup.

History
According to the official records, in Turkey, basketball was first played in 1904 at Robert College. An American physical education teacher laid the foundations of this sport in Turkey. 7 years later, Ahmet Robenson, a physical education teacher in Galatasaray High School decided to introduce a new game to students in 1911. Robenson, who also became a Galatasaray S.K. president later, popularized this sport in Turkey.

Basketball had always been very important for the club. The team has won 16 national championship titles and 15 İstanbul League titles. Former president of the club, Özhan Canaydın was a former player of the basketball team. The team dominated Turkish basketball in the 1940s, and won titles in the 1950s and 1960s, while remaining a competitive team in the 1970s. In the 1980s, Galatasaray won two more championships, in 1985 and 1986, and won the 1990 title. For much of the 1990s and 2000s, Galatasaray struggled. In 2013, Galatasaray won back the Turkish championship. 
 
On 24 June 2011, Galatasaray announced that Cafe Crown's sponsorship was over.

Galatasaray qualified for the EuroLeague for the first time in history after winning the qualification knockout round that gained them a place in the EuroLeague season.

On April 27, 2016, Galatasaray defeated SIG Strasbourg with the score of 78–67 at Abdi Ipekci Arena in the second leg of the 2016 EuroCup Finals. With this result Galatasaray won the EuroCup championship for the first time.

Sponsorship naming
Due to sponsorship deals, Galatasaray have been also known as:

 Galatasaray Cafe Crown: (2005–2011)
 Galatasaray Medical Park: (2011–2013)
 Galatasaray Liv Hospital: (2013–2015)
 Galatasaray Odeabank: (2015–2018)
Galatasaray Doğa Sigorta: (2019–2020)
Galatasaray: (2020–2021)
Galatasaray Nef: (2021–present)

Home courts

Technical staff

Administrative staff

Players

Current roster

Depth chart

Honours

Domestic competitions
Turkish Super League
 Winners (5): 1968–69, 1984–85, 1985–86, 1989–90, 2012–13
 Runners-up (3): 1986–87, 2010–11, 2013–14
Turkish Championship (defunct)
 Winners (11) (record): 1947, 1948, 1949, 1950, 1953, 1955, 1956, 1960, 1963, 1964, 1966 
 Runners-up (4): 1946, 1951, 1952, 1961
Turkish Cup
 Winners (3): 1969–70, 1971–72, 1994–95
 Runners-up (2): 1968–69, 2012–13
President's Cup
 Winners (2): 1985, 2011
Istanbul Basketball League
 Winners (15):Istanbul Basketball League

European competitions
EuroCup
 Winners (1): 2015–16

Season by season

 Cancelled due to the COVID-19 pandemic in Europe.

Team captains

Head coaches

Notable players

See also
 See also Galatasaray S.K. (women's basketball)
 See also Galatasaray S.K. (wheelchair basketball)

References

External links

 Galatasaray SK Official Web Site 
 Unofficial Fan Site and Forum 
 Turkish Basketball League 
 TBLStat.net Profile 
 at Eurobasket.com 
 euroleague.net 

 
Men
Basketball teams in Turkey
Turkish Basketball Super League teams
EuroLeague clubs
Basketball teams established in 1911
1911 establishments in the Ottoman Empire
Sports teams in Istanbul